A detention basin or retarding basin is an excavated area installed on, or adjacent to, tributaries of rivers, streams, lakes or bays to protect against flooding and, in some cases, downstream erosion by storing water for a limited period of time. These basins are also called dry ponds, holding ponds or dry detention basins if no permanent pool of water exists. 

Detention ponds that are designed to permanently retain some volume of water at all times are called retention basins. In its basic form, a detention basin is used to manage water quantity while having a limited effectiveness in protecting water quality, unless it includes a permanent pool feature.

Functions and design

Detention basins are storm water best management practices that provide general flood protection and can also control extreme floods such as a 1 in 100-year storm event. The basins are typically built during the construction of new land development projects including residential subdivisions or shopping centers. The ponds help manage the excess urban runoff generated by newly constructed impervious surfaces such  as roads, parking lots and rooftops.

A basin functions by allowing large flows of water to enter but limits the outflow by having a small opening at the lowest point of the structure.  The size of this opening is determined by the capacity of  underground and downstream culverts and washes to handle the release of the contained water.

Frequently the inflow area is constructed to protect the structure from some types of damage. Offset concrete blocks in the entrance spillways are used to reduce the speed of entering flood water. These structures may also have debris drop vaults to collect large rocks.  These vaults are deep holes under the entrance to the structure. The holes are wide enough to allow large rocks and other debris to fall into the holes before they can damage the rest of the structure. These vaults must be emptied after each storm event.

Research has shown that detention basins built with real-time control of the outflow from the basin are significantly more effective at retaining total suspended solids and associated contaminants, such as heavy metals, when compared to basins without control.

Extended detention basin
A variant basin design called an extended detention dry basin can limit downstream erosion and control of some pollutants such as suspended solids. This basin type differs from a retention basin, also known as a "wet pond," which includes a permanent pool of water, and which is typically designed to protect water quality.

While basic detention ponds are often designed to empty within 6 to 12 hours after a storm, extended detention (ED) dry basins improve on the basic detention design by lengthening the storage time, for example, to 24 or 48 hours. Longer storage times tend to result in improved water quality because  additional suspended solids are removed.

See also
Best management practice for water pollution
Groundwater banking
Retention basin
Stream restoration
Sustainable urban drainage systems
Sustainable Flood Retention Basin
Balancing lake

References

External links

Detention vs. retention - Project Brays (Harris County, Texas)
Maintaining Your BMPs: A Guidebook for Private Owners & Operators in Northern Virginia

Environmental engineering
Hydraulic engineering
Hydrology
Infrastructure
Ponds
Water treatment
Stormwater management
Water supply